This is a timeline documenting events of Jazz in the year 1986.

Events

March
 21 – The 13th Vossajazz started in Voss, Norway (March 21 – 23).

May
 16 – 15th Moers Festival started in Moers, Germany (May 16 – 19).
 21 – 14th Nattjazz started in Bergen, Norway (May 21 – June 4).

June
 27 – The 7th Montreal International Jazz Festival started in Montreal, Quebec, Canada (June 27 – July 6).

July
 3 – The 20th Montreux Jazz Festival started in Montreux, Switzerland (July 43 – 19).
 11 – The 11th North Sea Jazz Festival started in The Hague, Netherlands (July 11 – 13).

August
 15 – The 3rd Brecon Jazz Festival started in Brecon, Wales (April 15 – 17).

September
 19 – The 29th Monterey Jazz Festival started in Monterey, California (September 19 – 21).

Album releases

16–17: 16–17
Tim Berne: Fulton Street Maul
Ran Blake: Short Life of Barbara Monk
Larry Carlton: Alone / But Never Alone 
Larry Carlton: Discovery
John Carter: Dance of Love Ghosts
Steve Coleman: On the Edge of Tomorrow
Christy Doran: Red Twist and Tuned Arrow
Eliane Elias: Illusions
ICP Orchestra: Bospaadje Konijnehol I
Kenny G: Duotones
Steve Lacy: Outings
Last Exit: Last Exit 
Last Exit: Koln
Lyle Mays: Lyle Mays
Pat Metheny & Ornette Coleman: Song X
James Newton: Romance and Revolution
Evan Parker: Atlanta
Evan Parker: The Snake Decides
Courtney Pine: Journey to the Urge Within
Ned Rothenberg: Trespass
Arturo Sandoval: Tumbaito 
Sonny Sharrock: Guitar
Michael Shrieve: In Suspect Terrain
Jim Staley: Mumbo Jumbo
Henry Threadgill: You Know the Number
Cecil Taylor: For Olim
Bobby Watson: Love Remains
Kazumi Watanabe: Spice Of Life
Reggie Workman: Synthesis
John Zorn: Cobra

Deaths

 January
 26 – Ken Moule, English pianist, composer, and arranger (born 1925).
 29 – Everett Barksdale, American guitarist (born 1910).

 February
 26 – Karel Vlach, Czech musician, orchestra conductor, and arranger (born 1911).

 March
 21 – Raymond Burke, American clarinetist (born 1904).

 April
 26 – Cliff Leeman, American drummer (born 1913).

 May
 19 – Jimmy Lyons, American alto saxophonist (born 1931).
 30 – Hank Mobley, American tenor saxophonist (born 1930).

 June
 13 – Benny Goodman, American clarinetist and bandleader (born 1909).
 29 – Cliff Townshend, English saxophonist and clarinetist (born 1916).

 July
 3 – Curley Russell, American upright bassist (born 1917).
 31 – Teddy Wilson, American pianist (born 1912).

 August
 21 – Thad Jones, American trumpeter (born 1923).

 September
 2 – Billy Taylor, American upright bassist (born 1906).
 10 – Pepper Adams, American baritone saxophonist and composer (born 1930).

 October
 22 – Thorgeir Stubø, Norwegian guitarist, band leader, and composer (born 1943).
 27 – Alan Branscombe, English pianist, vibraphonist, and alto saxophonist (born 1936).

 November
 3 – Eddie "Lockjaw" Davis, American tenor saxophonist (born 1922).
 23 – Svein Øvergaard, Norwegian saxophonist and percussionist (born 1912).

 December
 2 – Paul Bascomb, American tenor saxophonist (born 1912).

 Unknown date
 Arthur Rosebery, English pianist and singer (born 1904).

Births

 January
 4 – Theo Jackson, British songwriter, pianist and vocalist.
 12 – Philip Schjetlein, Norwegian guitarist.
 27 – Takashi Matsunaga, Japanese pianist and composer.

 March
 10 – Justin Kauflin, American pianist, composer, and record producer.
 11 – Ayumi Tanaka, Japanese pianist.
 19 – Susanne Sundfør, Norwegian singer and songwriter.

 April
 20 – Roxy Coss, American saxophonist and composer.
 23 – Laura Mvula, British singer, songwriter, and composer.

 May
 18 – Adam Bałdych, Polish violinist, composer, music producer.
 26 – Kit Downes, British pianist and composeer.

 June
 24 – Ivan Blomqvist, Swedish pianist, keyboarder, and composer.

 July
 11 – Jakop Janssønn Hauan, Norwegian drummer.
 21 – Rebecca Ferguson, British singer and songwriter.

 October
 10 – Ellen Andrea Wang, Norwegian upright bassist and singer.

 November
 8 – Nikola Rachelle, British singer and songwriter.
 11 – Jon Batiste, American singer, multi-instrumentalist, and bandleader.
 12 – Jonas Kilmork Vemøy, Norwegian trumpeter, and composer.
 13 – Miss Tati, Norwegian DJ, singer, and songwriter.

 December
 2 – Tal Wilkenfeld, Australian bass guitarist.

 Unknown date
 Adrián Carrio, Spanish pianist.
 Emilie Stoesen Christensen, Norwegian singer and actor.
 Jon Audun Baar, Norwegian drummer.
 Julia Kadel, German pianist, composer, and band leader.
 Lars Ove Fossheim, Norwegian jazz guitarist.
 Romano Ricciardi, Italian-Swiss saxophonist.
 Sasha Masakowski, American singer.

See also

 1980s in jazz
 List of years in jazz
 1986 in music

References

External links 
 History Of Jazz Timeline: 1986 at All About Jazz

Jazz
Jazz by year